Vanessa dejeanii is a butterfly of the family Nymphalidae found in the Philippines and on Java, Lombok and Bali.

Subspecies
Vanessa dejeanii dejeanii (Java, Bali, Lombok)
Vanessa dejeanii mounseyi (Talbot, 1936) (Philippines: Mindanao, Samar)

References

Butterflies described in 1824
dejeanii
Taxa named by Jean-Baptiste Godart